Sandoval County/US 550 is a station on the New Mexico Rail Runner Express commuter rail line, located in Bernalillo, New Mexico, United States.

It is located on the south side of U.S. Route 550 just west of the I-25 interchange, at the north end of Bernalillo. It serves residents of southeastern Sandoval County, including Bernalillo and Rio Rancho. The station opened on July 14, 2006 as one of the three original stations on the line along with Los Ranchos/Journal Center and Downtown Albuquerque.

There is a park and ride lot located on the hill above the station, which is connected to the platform by a pedestrian bridge. The station has free parking, with 191 spaces. The Sandoval Easy Express shuttle service serves the station, as well as a shuttle to the nearby Santa Ana Star Casino.

Each of the Rail Runner stations contains an icon to express each community's identity. The icon representing this station is the wine grape, representing the numerous vineyards and wine makers in the area.

Platform
Sandoval County/US 550 Station opened with a platform built long enough to accommodate three cars. Within a year of service, the Rail Runner was running five-car trains during peak periods. This prompted MRCOG to expand the platforms at Los Ranchos & Sandoval/US 550 Stations to accommodate 4 cars in 2009. The last car (Closest to the engine) is usually filled with passengers destined for the Santa Fe South Capitol and Depot stations.

Gallery

References

External links

Stations, Sandoval County/US 550 Official Rail Runner site

Railway stations in New Mexico
Railway stations in the United States opened in 2006
Buildings and structures in Sandoval County, New Mexico
Transportation in Sandoval County, New Mexico
2006 establishments in New Mexico